William Likely III (born September 13, 1994) is an American football cornerback for the Houston Roughnecks of the XFL. He played college football at the University of Maryland, College Park.

On September 5, 2015, Likely broke a 76-year-old Big Ten Conference single-game record when he returned 8 punts for 233 yards in the season opener against Richmond. He was selected by both the coaches and media as a first-team return specialist and also by the coaches as a first-team defensive back on the 2015 All-Big Ten Conference football team.

College career
Likely played for the Maryland Terrapins from 2013 to 2016.

Maryland career records
 Single-season interception return yards (170, 2014)
 Single-season interceptions returned for TD (2, 2014)
 Single-game kickoff return yards (228 yards vs. Michigan State, 2014)
 Single-game punt return yards (233 yards vs. Richmond, 2015)
 Co-longest kickoff return average in a season (31.0 yards, 2014)
 Co-longest kickoff return (100 yards vs. Stanford, 2014)

Professional career

New England Patriots
Likely signed with the Patriots as an undrafted free agent on June 5, 2017. He was waived on September 2, 2017.

Toronto Argonauts
The Toronto Argonauts signed Likely to their practice squad on August 21, 2018.

Hamilton Tiger-Cats
Likely was signed to the Hamilton Tiger-Cats' practice roster on June 18, 2019. He was promoted to the active roster on July 12, and demoted to the practice roster on July 31. He was promoted again on September 19, and demoted again on September 26. He was released from the practice roster after the season on November 26, 2019.

DC Defenders
Likely signed with the DC Defenders of the XFL during mini-camp in December 2019. He was waived during final roster cuts on January 22, 2020.

Houston Gamblers
Likely was selected in the 9th round of the 2022 USFL Draft by the Houston Gamblers.

Houston Roughnecks
The Houston Roughnecks selected Likely in the first round of the 2023 XFL Supplemental Draft on January 1, 2023.

Notes

References

External links 
Maryland Terrapins bio

1994 births
Living people
Players of American football from Florida
Sportspeople from the Miami metropolitan area
American football defensive backs
American football return specialists
Maryland Terrapins football players
New England Patriots players
People from Belle Glade, Florida
Hamilton Tiger-Cats players
Toronto Argonauts players
Canadian football defensive backs
American players of Canadian football
DC Defenders players
Houston Gamblers (2022) players
Houston Roughnecks players